Vance and Pepe's Porn Start is a comedic mockumentary directed by and starring Mark Kenneth Woods, and co-starring Michael Venus, Ryan Steele, and Rachelle Lachland. It had its debut at the Out On Screen Vancouver Queer Film Festival in August 2011. The DVD was released January 17, 2012 through MKW Productions and had its television broadcast debut on July 29, 2012 on OUTtv in Canada.

Synopsis
In this mockumentary, Vance (Michael Venus) and Pepe (Mark Kenneth Woods), two hosts of a renowned reality makeover series, find out their show has been cancelled. Desperate for work, they anxiously devise a plan to use their fame to find new careers in the porn industry. Sensing a train wreck is near, a documentary crew follow the 'famous' reality TV duo as they try to create a film based on 'Showgirls' and 'Twilight' but find out that making it big in porn is a long and hard process.

Cast
Mark Kenneth Woods as Pepe Pérez
Michael Venus as Vance Vanderbilt
Ryan Steele as Dino Donovan
Rachelle Lachland as Monica Montgomery
Toban Ralston as Kurt Kidd
Charlie David (voice) as Gavin Gallagher
Rob Easton as Steve Stryker
Warren Frey as Bartholomew Babcock
Mel Siermaczescki as Daphne

Titles
The film's title has also been shortened to "Vance and Pepe" and "Porn Start" for its original theatrical and television releases.

Critical reception
The film received mixed reviews with Robert O'Neil of TLA Video praising the actors' performances as being in "complete commitment to their bizarre roles – especially Mark Kenneth Woods and Michael Venus, who would seem right at home on Saturday Night Live".

References

External links
Official site

Trailer

2011 films
2011 black comedy films
English-language Canadian films
Canadian LGBT-related films
Canadian black comedy films
2011 LGBT-related films
LGBT-related comedy films
2011 comedy films
2010s English-language films
2010s Canadian films